Vestøl may refer to:

People
Aage Vestøl (1922–2008), a Norwegian chess player
Bjørnar Vestøl (born 1974), a Norwegian cyclist
Harald Vestøl (born 1945), a Norwegian politician

Places
Vestøl, Agder, a village in the municipality of Gjerstad in Agder county, Norway
Vestøl, Birkenes, a farm area in the municipality of Birkenes in Agder county, Norway